This is an incomplete list of Statutory Rules of Northern Ireland in 1996.

1-100

 Disability Discrimination Act 1995 (Commencement No. 1) Order (Northern Ireland) 1996 (S.R. 1996 No. 1)
 Roads (Speed Limit) Order (Northern Ireland) 1996 (S.R. 1996 No. 2)
 Royal Ulster Constabulary Pensions (Amendment) Regulations 1996 (S.R. 1996 No. 4)
 Royal Ulster Constabulary Reserve (Full-Time) Pensions (Amendment) Regulations 1996 (S.R. 1996 No. 5)
 Taxis (Newtownards) Bye-Laws (Northern Ireland) 1996 (S.R. 1996 No. 6)
 Hill Livestock (Compensatory Allowances) (Amendment) Regulations (Northern Ireland) 1996 (S.R. 1996 No. 7)
 Marking of Animals Order (Northern Ireland) 1996 (S.R. 1996 No. 9)
 Judicial Pensions (Additional Voluntary Contributions) (Amendment) Regulations (Northern Ireland) 1996 (S.R. 1996 No. 10)
 Social Security (Persons from Abroad) (Miscellaneous Amendments) Regulations (Northern Ireland) 1996 (S.R. 1996 No. 11)
 Motor Vehicle Testing (Extension) Order (Northern Ireland) 1996 (S.R. 1996 No. 12)
 Northern Ireland Disability Council Regulations (Northern Ireland) 1996 (S.R. 1996 No. 13)
 Health and Safety (Medical Fees) Regulations (Northern Ireland) 1996 (S.R. 1996 No. 14)
 Children (1995 Order) (Commencement No. 2) Order (Northern Ireland) 1996 (S.R. 1996 No. 15)
 Diseases of Fish (Control) Regulations (Northern Ireland) 1996 (S.R. 1996 No. 16)
 Price Marking (Amendment) Order (Northern Ireland) 1996 (S.R. 1996 No. 17)
 Plant Health (Wood and Bark) (Amendment) Order (Northern Ireland) 1996 (S.R. 1996 No. 18)
 County Court (Amendment) Rules (Northern Ireland) 1996 (S.R. 1996 No. 19)
 Homefirst Community Health and Social Services Trust (Establishment) Order (Northern Ireland) 1996 (S.R. 1996 No. 20)
 Health and Safety (Repeals and Revocations) Regulations (Northern Ireland) 1996 (S.R. 1996 No. 21)
 Litter (Statutory Undertakers) (Designation and Relevant Land) Order (Northern Ireland) 1996 (S.R. 1996 No. 22)
 Air Quality Standards (Amendment) Regulations (Northern Ireland) 1996 (S.R. 1996 No. 23)
 Social Security (Adjudication) and Child Support (Amendment) Regulations (Northern Ireland) 1996 (S.R. 1996 No. 24)
 Registered Rents (Increase) Order (Northern Ireland) 1996 (S.R. 1996 No. 25)
 Jobseekers (1995 Order) (Commencement No. 1) Order (Northern Ireland) 1996 (S.R. 1996 No. 26)
 Traffic Weight Restriction (Millbay Road, Islandmagee) Order (Northern Ireland) 1996 (S.R. 1996 No. 27)
 Employer's Contributions Re-imbursement Regulations (Northern Ireland) 1996 (S.R. 1996 No. 30)
 Driver & Vehicle Testing Agency Trading Fund Order (Northern Ireland) 1996 (S.R. 1996 No. 32)
 Roads (Speed Limit) (No. 2) Order (Northern Ireland) 1996 (S.R. 1996 No. 33)
 Roads (Speed Limit) (No. 3) Order (Northern Ireland) 1996 (S.R. 1996 No. 34)
 Traffic Weight Restriction (British Road, Aldergrove, Crumlin) Order (Northern Ireland) 1996 (S.R. 1996 No. 37)
 Public Use of the Records (Management and Fees) Rules (Northern Ireland) 1996 (S.R. 1996 No. 38)
 Experimental Speed Limit (Route A1) (Continuation) Order (Northern Ireland) 1996 (S.R. 1996 No. 39)
 Criminal Justice Act 1988 (Reviews of Sentencing) Order (Northern Ireland) 1996 (S.R. 1996 No. 40)
 Planning (Fees) (Amendment) Regulations (Northern Ireland) 1996 (S.R. 1996 No. 41)
 Temporary Speed Limit (Sydenham By-Pass, Route A2, Belfast) (Continuation) (Revocation) Order (Northern Ireland) 1996 (S.R. 1996 No. 42)
 One-Way Traffic (Belfast) (Amendment) Order (Northern Ireland) 1996 (S.R. 1996 No. 44)
 One-Way Traffic (Ballymena) (Amendment) Order (Northern Ireland) 1996 (S.R. 1996 No. 45)
 Rates (Regional Rate) Order (Northern Ireland) 1996 (S.R. 1996 No. 46)
 Spreadable Fats (Marketing Standards) Regulations (Northern Ireland) 1996 (S.R. 1996 No. 47)
 Sweeteners in Food Regulations (Northern Ireland) 1996 (S.R. 1996 No. 48)
 Colours in Food Regulations (Northern Ireland) 1996 (S.R. 1996 No. 49)
 Miscellaneous Food Additives Regulations (Northern Ireland) 1996 (S.R. 1996 No. 50)
 Bread and Flour Regulations (Northern Ireland) 1996 (S.R. 1996 No. 51)
 Cheese and Cream Regulations (Northern Ireland) 1996 (S.R. 1996 No. 52)
 Food (Miscellaneous Revocations and Amendments) Regulations (Northern Ireland) 1996 (S.R. 1996 No. 53)
 Magistrates' Courts (Drug Trafficking Act 1994) Rules (Northern Ireland) 1996 (S.R. 1996 No. 54)
 Magistrates' Courts (Child Abduction and Custody) (Amendment) Rules (Northern Ireland) 1996 (S.R. 1996 No. 55)
 Magistrates' Courts (Family Law Act 1986) (Amendment) Rules (Northern Ireland) 1996 (S.R. 1996 No. 56)
 Social Security (Industrial Injuries and Diseases) (Miscellaneous Amendments) Regulations (Northern Ireland) 1996 (S.R. 1996 No. 57)
 Social Security (Contributions) (Amendment) Regulations (Northern Ireland) 1996 (S.R. 1996 No. 58)
 Bus Lane (Queen's Square, Belfast) Order (Northern Ireland) 1996 (S.R. 1996 No. 59)
 One-Way Traffic (Belfast) (Amendment No. 2) Order (Northern Ireland) 1996 (S.R. 1996 No. 60)
 Social Security (Incapacity for Work) (General) (Amendment) Regulations (Northern Ireland) 1996 (S.R. 1996 No. 61)
 Guaranteed Minimum Pensions Increase Order (Northern Ireland) 1996 (S.R. 1996 No. 62)
 One-Way Traffic (Ballymena) (Amendment No. 2) Order (Northern Ireland) 1996 (S.R. 1996 No. 63)
 Child Support (Maintenance Assessments and Special Cases) and Social Security (Claims and Payments) (Amendment) Regulations (Northern Ireland) 1996 (S.R. 1996 No. 65)
 Traffic Signs (Amendment) Regulations (Northern Ireland) 1996 (S.R. 1996 No. 69)
 Crown Court (Children's Evidence) (Dismissal of Transferred Charges) Rules (Northern Ireland) 1996 (S.R. 1996 No. 70)
 Crown Court (Amendment) Rules (Northern Ireland) 1996 (S.R. 1996 No. 71)
 Social Security (Contributions) (Re-rating and Northern Ireland National Insurance Fund Payments) Order (Northern Ireland) 1996 (S.R. 1996 No. 72)
 Social Security Benefits Up-rating Order (Northern Ireland) 1996 (S.R. 1996 No. 73)
 Social Security Benefits Up-rating Regulations (Northern Ireland) 1996 (S.R. 1996 No. 74)
 Social Security (Industrial Injuries) (Dependency) (Permitted Earnings Limits) Order (Northern Ireland) 1996 (S.R. 1996 No. 75)
 Workmen's Compensation (Supplementation) (Amendment) Regulations (Northern Ireland) 1996 (S.R. 1996 No. 76)
 Statutory Maternity Pay (Compensation of Employers) (Amendment) Regulations (Northern Ireland) 1996 (S.R. 1996 No. 77)
 Income Support (General) (Amendment) Regulations (Northern Ireland) 1996 (S.R. 1996 No. 78)
 Social Security (Contributions) (Amendment No. 2) Regulations (Northern Ireland) 1996 (S.R. 1996 No. 79)
 Diseases of Animals (Importation of Bird Products) Order (Northern Ireland) 1996 (S.R. 1996 No. 81)
 Diseases of Animals (Importation of Poultry) (Amendment) Order (Northern Ireland) 1996 (S.R. 1996 No. 82)
 Health and Personal Social Services (Assessment of Resources) (Amendment) Regulations (Northern Ireland) 1996 (S.R. 1996 No. 83)
 Housing Benefit (General) (Amendment) Regulations (Northern Ireland) 1996 (S.R. 1996 No. 84)
 Social Security (Claims and Payments Etc.) (Amendment) Regulations (Northern Ireland) 1996 (S.R. 1996 No. 85)
 Judicial Pensions (Additional Voluntary Contributions) (No. 2) (Amendment) Regulations (Northern Ireland) 1996 (S.R. 1996 No. 86)
 Department of the Environment (Fees) Order (Northern Ireland) 1996 (S.R. 1996 No. 87)
 Social Security (Contributions) (Amendment No. 3) Regulations (Northern Ireland) 1996 (S.R. 1996 No. 89)
 Pensions Increase (Review) Order (Northern Ireland) 1996 (S.R. 1996 No. 90)
 Pensions (1995 Order) (Commencement No. 2) Order (Northern Ireland) 1996 (S.R. 1996 No. 91)
 Income-Related Benefits (Amendment) Regulations (Northern Ireland) 1996 (S.R. 1996 No. 92)
 Income-Related Benefits (Miscellaneous Amendments) Regulations (Northern Ireland) 1996 (S.R. 1996 No. 93)
 Occupational Pension Schemes (Discharge of Protected Rights on Winding Up) Regulations (Northern Ireland) 1996 (S.R. 1996 No. 94)
 Personal and Occupational Pension Schemes (Miscellaneous Amendments) Regulations (Northern Ireland) 1996 (S.R. 1996 No. 95)
 Legal Advice and Assistance (Financial Conditions) Regulations (Northern Ireland) 1996 (S.R. 1996 No. 96)
 Legal Aid (Financial Conditions) Regulations (Northern Ireland) 1996 (S.R. 1996 No. 97)
 Legal Advice and Assistance (Amendment) Regulations (Northern Ireland) 1996 (S.R. 1996 No. 98)
 Child Support Commissioners (Procedure) (Amendment) Regulations (Northern Ireland) 1996 (S.R. 1996 No. 99)
 Supreme Court Fees Order (Northern Ireland) 1996 (S.R. 1996 No. 100)

101-200

 Judgment Enforcement Fees Order (Northern Ireland) 1996 (S.R. 1996 No. 101)
 Magistrates' Courts Fees Order (Northern Ireland) 1996 (S.R. 1996 No. 102)
 County Court Fees Order (Northern Ireland) 1996 (S.R. 1996 No. 103)
 Supreme Court (Non-Contentious Probate) Fees Order (Northern Ireland) 1996 (S.R. 1996 No. 104)
 Matrimonial Causes Fees Order (Northern Ireland) 1996 (S.R. 1996 No. 105)
 Dental Charges (Amendment) Regulations (Northern Ireland) 1996 (S.R. 1996 No. 106)
 Travelling Expenses and Remission of Charges (Amendment) Regulations (Northern Ireland) 1996 (S.R. 1996 No. 107)
 Social Security (Contributions), Statutory Maternity Pay and Statutory Sick Pay (Miscellaneous Amendments) Regulations (Northern Ireland) 1996 (S.R. 1996 No. 108)
 Health and Safety (Medical Devices) Regulations (Northern Ireland) 1996 (S.R. 1996 No. 109)
 Housing Renovation etc. Grants (Reduction of Grant) (Amendment) Regulations (Northern Ireland) 1996 (S.R. 1996 No. 110)
 Housing Benefit (General) (Amendment No. 2) Regulations (Northern Ireland) 1996 (S.R. 1996 No. 111)
 Charges for Drugs and Appliances (Amendment) Regulations (Northern Ireland) 1996 (S.R. 1996 No. 112)
 Motor Hackney Carriages (Belfast) (Amendment) By-Laws (Northern Ireland) 1996 (S.R. 1996 No. 113)
 General Dental Services (Amendment) Regulation z (Northern Ireland) 1996 (S.R. 1996 No. 114)
 Housing Benefit (General and Supply of Information) (Amendment) Regulations (Northern Ireland) 1996 (S.R. 1996 No. 115)
 Sperrin Lakeland Health and Social Services Trust (Establishment) Order (Northern Ireland) 1996 (S.R. 1996 No. 116)
 Foyle Health and Social Services Trust (Establishment) (Amendment) Order (Northern Ireland) 1996 (S.R. 1996 No. 117)
 Roads (Speed Limit) (No. 4) Order (Northern Ireland) 1996 (S.R. 1996 No. 118)
 Health and Safety (Safety Signs and Signals) Regulations (Northern Ireland) 1996 (S.R. 1996 No. 119)
 Income Support (General) (Amendment No. 2) Regulations (Northern Ireland) 1996 (S.R. 1996 No. 120)
 Children's Evidence (1995 Order) (Commencement) Order (Northern Ireland) 1996 (S.R. 1996 No. 122)
 Health and Personal Social Services (Amendment) (1995 Order) (Commencement No. 2) Order (Northern Ireland) 1996 (S.R. 1996 No. 123)
 Optical Charges and Payments (Amendment) Regulations (Northern Ireland) 1996 (S.R. 1996 No. 124)
 Health and Social Services Trusts (Originating Capital Debt) Order (Northern Ireland) 1996 (S.R. 1996 No. 125)
 Magistrates' Courts (Amendment) Rules (Northern Ireland) 1996 (S.R. 1996 No. 126)
 Magistrates' Courts (Children's Evidence) (Notices of Transfer) Rules (Northern Ireland) 1996 (S.R. 1996 No. 127)
 Guardians Ad Litem (Panel) Regulation (Northern Ireland) 1996 (S.R. 1996 No. 128)
 Health and Personal Social Services (Fund-holding Practices) Amendment Regulations (Northern Ireland) 1996 (S.R. 1996 No. 131)
 Beef (Emergency Control) Order (Northern Ireland) 1996 (S.R. 1996 No. 132)
 Specified Bovine Material Order (Northern Ireland) 1996 (S.R. 1996 No. 133)
 Specified Bovine Material (Treatment and Disposal) Regulations (Northern Ireland) 1996 (S.R. 1996 No. 134)
 General Ophthalmic Services (Amendment) Regulations (Northern Ireland) 1996 (S.R. 1996 No. 135)
 General Medical and Pharmaceutical Services (Amendment) Regulations (Northern Ireland) 1996 (S.R. 1996 No. 136)
 Health and Personal Social Services (Disciplinary Procedures) Regulations (Northern Ireland) 1996 (S.R. 1996 No. 137)
 Goods Vehicles (Testing) (Amendment) Regulations (Northern Ireland) 1996 (S.R. 1996 No. 139)
 Motor Vehicle Testing (Amendment) Regulations (Northern Ireland) 1996 (S.R. 1996 No. 140)
 Motor Vehicles (Driving Licences) (Amendment) (Test Fees) Regulations (Northern Ireland) 1996 (S.R. 1996 No. 141)
 Motor Vehicles (Taxi Drivers' Licences) (Fees) (Amendment) Regulations (Northern Ireland) 1996 (S.R. 1996 No. 142)
 Public Service Vehicles (Licence Fees) (Amendment) Regulations (Northern Ireland) 1996 (S.R. 1996 No. 143)
 International Transport of Goods under Cover of TIR Carnets (Fees) (Amendment) Regulations (Northern Ireland) 1996 (S.R. 1996 No. 144)
 Passenger and Goods Vehicles (Recording Equipment) Regulations (Northern Ireland) 1996 (S.R. 1996 No. 145)
 Motor Vehicles (Payments in Respect of Applicants for Exemption from Wearing Seat Belts) Order (Northern Ireland) 1996 (S.R. 1996 No. 146)
 Repairs Grants (Eligible Expense) Order (Northern Ireland) 1996 (S.R. 1996 No. 147)
 Housing Renovation etc. Grants (Grant Limit) Order (Northern Ireland) 1996 (S.R. 1996 No. 148)
 Social Security (Reduced Rates of Class 1 Contributions) (Salary Related Contracted-out Schemes) Order (Northern Ireland) 1996 (S.R. 1996 No. 149)
 Social Security (Reduced Rates of Class 1 Contributions and Rebates) (Money Purchase Contracted-out Schemes) Order (Northern Ireland) 1996 (S.R. 1996 No. 150)
 Social Security (Minimum Contributions to Appropriate Personal Pension Schemes) Order (Northern Ireland) 1996 (S.R. 1996 No. 151)
 Social Security (Contributions) (Amendment No. 4) Regulations (Northern Ireland) 1996 (S.R. 1996 No. 152)
 Children's Evidence (Northern Ireland) Order 1995 (Notice of Transfer) Regulations 1996 (S.R. 1996 No. 153)
 Motor Vehicles (Type Approval) (Amendment) Regulations (Northern Ireland) 1996 (S.R. 1996 No. 156)
 Land Registry (Fees) Order (Northern Ireland) 1996 (S.R. 1996 No. 157)
 Health and Safety (Miscellaneous Fees Amendment) Regulations (Northern Ireland) 1996 (S.R. 1996 No. 159)
 Health and Social Services Trusts (Originating Capital Debt) (Amendment) Order (Northern Ireland) 1996 (S.R. 1996 No. 160)
 One-Way Traffic (Omagh) (Amendment) Order (Northern Ireland) 1996 (S.R. 1996 No. 161)
 Roads (Speed Limit) (No. 5) Order (Northern Ireland) 1996 (S.R. 1996 No. 162)
 One-Way Traffic (Killyleagh) Order (Northern Ireland) 1996 (S.R. 1996 No. 163)
 Plastic Materials and Articles in Contact with Food (Amendment) Regulations (Northern Ireland) 1996 (S.R. 1996 No. 164)
 Fertilisers (Mammalian Meat and Bone Meal) Regulations (Northern Ireland) 1996 (S.R. 1996 No. 165)
 Social Security Revaluation of Earnings Factors Order (Northern Ireland) 1996 (S.R. 1996 No. 168)
 Urban Clearways (Belfast) (No. 2) Order (Amendment) Order (Northern Ireland) 1996 (S.R. 1996 No. 170)
 Traffic Weight Restriction (Rosscor Viaduct Bridge) Order (Northern Ireland) 1996 (S.R. 1996 No. 171)
 Community Work Programme (Miscellaneous Provisions) Order (Northern Ireland) 1996 (S.R. 1996 No. 172)
 Industrial Tribunals (Constitution and Rules of Procedure) Regulations (Northern Ireland) 1996 (S.R. 1996 No. 173)
 Beef (Emergency Control) (Amendment) Order (Northern Ireland) 1996 (S.R. 1996 No. 175)
 Weights and Measures (Guernsey and Alderney) Order (Northern Ireland) 1996 (S.R. 1996 No. 177)
 Temporary Speed Limit (Sydenham By-Pass, Route A2, Belfast) Order (Northern Ireland) 1996 (S.R. 1996 No. 178)
 Companies (Summary Financial Statement) Regulations (Northern Ireland) 1996 (S.R. 1996 No. 179)
 Jobseekers (1995 Order) (Commencement No. 2) Order (Northern Ireland) 1996 (S.R. 1996 No. 180)
 Housing Benefit (General) (Amendment No. 3) Regulations (Northern Ireland) 1996 (S.R. 1996 No. 181)
 Bovine Animals (Enforcement of Community Purchase Scheme) Regulations (Northern Ireland) 1996 (S.R. 1996 No. 182)
 Slaughter-houses (Licensing) (Amendment) Regulations (Northern Ireland) 1996 (S.R. 1996 No. 183)
 Social Security Benefits Up-rating (No. 2) Order (Northern Ireland) 1996 (S.R. 1996 No. 184)
 Specified Bovine Material (Amendment) Order (Northern Ireland) 1996 (S.R. 1996 No. 185)
 Specified Bovine Material (Treatment and Disposal) (Amendment) Regulations (Northern Ireland) 1996 (S.R. 1996 No. 186)
 Pharmaceutical Society of Northern Ireland (General) (Amendment) Regulations (Northern Ireland) 1996 (S.R. 1996 No. 187)
 Social Security (Additional Pension) (Contributions Paid in Error) Regulations (Northern Ireland) 1996 (S.R. 1996 No. 188)
 Local Government (General Grant) Order (Northern Ireland) 1996 (S.R. 1996 No. 189)
 Students Awards Regulations (Northern Ireland) 1996 (S.R. 1996 No. 190)
 Agricultural Processing and Marketing Grant Regulations (Northern Ireland) 1996 (S.R. 1996 No. 196)
 Motor Vehicles (Driving Licences) (Amendment No. 2) Regulations (Northern Ireland) 1996 (S.R. 1996 No. 197)
 Jobseeker's Allowance Regulations (Northern Ireland) 1996 (S.R. 1996 No. 198)
 Income Support (General) (Jobseeker's Allowance Consequential Amendments) Regulations (Northern Ireland) 1996 (S.R. 1996 No. 199)
 Jobseeker's Allowance (Transitional Provisions) Regulations (Northern Ireland) 1996 (S.R. 1996 No. 200)

201-300

 Social Security (Back to Work Bonus) Regulations (Northern Ireland) 1996 (S.R. 1996 No. 201)
 Social Security Benefits (Maintenance Payments and Consequential Amendments) Regulations (Northern Ireland) 1996 (S.R. 1996 No. 202)
 Occupational Pension Schemes (Internal Dispute Resolution Procedures) Regulations (Northern Ireland) 1996 (S.R. 1996 No. 203)
 Plant Health (Amendment) Order (Northern Ireland) 1996 (S.R. 1996 No. 204)
 Legal Advice and Assistance (Prospective Cost) Regulations (Northern Ireland) 1996 (S.R. 1996 No. 205)
 Statutory Maternity Pay (General) (Amendment) Regulations (Northern Ireland) 1996 (S.R. 1996 No. 206)
 Personal and Occupational Pension Schemes (Pensions Ombudsman) (Amendment) Regulations (Northern Ireland) 1996 (S.R. 1996 No. 207)
 Horse Racing (Charges on Bookmakers) Order (Northern Ireland) 1996 (S.R. 1996 No. 208)
 Travelling Expenses and Remission of Charges (Amendment No. 2) Regulations (Northern Ireland) 1996 (S.R. 1996 No. 209)
 Compulsory Acquisition (Interest) Order (Northern Ireland) 1996 (S.R. 1996 No. 210)
 Interest on Recoverable Sanitation Expenses Order (Northern Ireland) 1996 (S.R. 1996 No. 211)
 Rules of the Supreme Court (Northern Ireland) (Amendment) 1996 (S.R. 1996 No. 212)
 Countryside Access Regulations (Northern Ireland) 1996 (S.R. 1996 No. 213)
 Certification Officer (Fees) (Amendment) Regulations (Northern Ireland) 1996 (S.R. 1996 No. 214)
 Roads (Speed Limit) (No. 6) Order (Northern Ireland) 1996 (S.R. 1996 No. 215)
 Gas (1996 Order) (Commencement) Order (Northern Ireland) 1996 (S.R. 1996 No. 216)
 Protection of Water Against Agricultural Nitrate Pollution Regulations (Northern Ireland) 1996 (S.R. 1996 No. 217)
 Income Support (General) (Standard Interest Rate Amendment) Regulations (Northern Ireland) 1996 (S.R. 1996 No. 218)
 Disability Discrimination Act 1995 (Commencement No. 2) Order (Northern Ireland) 1996 (S.R. 1996 No. 219)
 Sperrin Lakeland Health and Social Services Trust (Establishment) (Amendment) Order (Northern Ireland) 1996 (S.R. 1996 No. 220)
 Housing Benefit (General) (Amendment No. 4) Regulations (Northern Ireland) 1996 (S.R. 1996 No. 221)
 Legal Aid in Criminal Proceedings (Costs) (Amendment) Rules (Northern Ireland) 1996 (S.R. 1996 No. 222)
 Street Works (1995 Order) (Commencement No. 1) Order (Northern Ireland) 1996 (S.R. 1996 No. 223)
 Family Credit (General) (Amendment) Regulations (Northern Ireland) 1996 (S.R. 1996 No. 224)
 Social Security (Disability Living Allowance, Attendance Allowance and Claims and Payments) (Amendment) Regulations (Northern Ireland) 1996 (S.R. 1996 No. 225)
 Offshore Installations and Wells (Design and Construction, etc.) Regulations (Northern Ireland) 1996 (S.R. 1996 No. 228)
 Suckler Cow Premium (Amendment) Regulations (Northern Ireland) 1996 (S.R. 1996 No. 229)
 Hill Livestock (Compensatory Allowances) Regulations (Northern Ireland) 1996 (S.R. 1996 No. 230)
 Game Birds Preservation Order (Northern Ireland) 1996 (S.R. 1996 No. 231)
 Planning (General Development) (Amendment) Order (Northern Ireland) 1996 (S.R. 1996 No. 232)
 On-Street Parking (Amendment) Bye-Laws (Northern Ireland) 1996 (S.R. 1996 No. 233)
 Off-Street Parking Bye-Laws (Northern Ireland) 1996 (S.R. 1996 No. 237)
 Diseases of Animals (Modification) Order (Northern Ireland) 1996 (S.R. 1996 No. 238)
 Brucellosis Control (Amendment) Order (Northern Ireland) 1996 (S.R. 1996 No. 239)
 Tuberculosis Control (Amendment) Order (Northern Ireland) 1996 (S.R. 1996 No. 240)
 Parking Places on Roads (Amendment) Order (Northern Ireland) 1996 (S.R. 1996 No. 241)
 Seed Potatoes (Amendment) Regulations (Northern Ireland) 1996 (S.R. 1996 No. 242)
 Disclosure of Interests in Shares (Amendment) Regulations (Northern Ireland) 1996 (S.R. 1996 No. 246)
 Equipment and Protective Systems Intended for Use in Potentially Explosive Atmospheres Regulations (Northern Ireland) 1996 (S.R. 1996 No. 247)
 Planning (Use Classes) (Amendment) Order (Northern Ireland) 1996 (S.R. 1996 No. 248)
 Plant Health (Amendment No. 2) Order (Northern Ireland) 1996 (S.R. 1996 No. 249)
 Genetically Modified Organisms (Contained Use) (Amendment) Regulations (Northern Ireland) 1996 (S.R. 1996 No. 250)
 Offshore, and Pipelines, Safety (1992 Order) (Commencement No. 2) Order (Northern Ireland) 1996 (S.R. 1996 No. 251)
 Financial Markets and Insolvency Regulations (Northern Ireland) 1996 (S.R. 1996 No. 252)
 Royal Ulster Constabulary (Discipline and Disciplinary Appeals) (Amendment) Regulations 1996 (S.R. 1996 No. 253)
 Royal Ulster Constabulary Reserve (Part-time) (Discipline and Disciplinary Appeals) (Amendment) Regulations 1996 (S.R. 1996 No. 254)
 Arable Area Payments (Grazing of Bovine Animals on Set-Aside Land) (Temporary Provisions) Regulations (Northern Ireland) 1996 (S.R. 1996 No. 258)
 Feeding Stuffs (Amendment) Regulations (Northern Ireland) 1996 (S.R. 1996 No. 259)
 Teachers' Superannuation (Additional Voluntary Contributions) Regulations (Northern Ireland) 1996 (S.R. 1996 No. 260)
 Police and Criminal Evidence (Northern Ireland) Order 1989 (Codes of Practice) (No. 2) Order 1996 (S.R. 1996 No. 261)
 Marking of Plastic Explosive for Detection Regulations (Northern Ireland) 1996 (S.R. 1996 No. 262)
 Food Safety (Fishery Products and Live Bivalve Molluscs and Other Shellfish) (Miscellaneous Amendments) Regulations (Northern Ireland) 1996 (S.R. 1996 No. 264)
 Registration of Deeds (Fees) Order (Northern Ireland) 1996 (S.R. 1996 No. 265)
 Juries (1996 Order) (Commencement) Order (Northern Ireland) 1996 (S.R. 1996 No. 267)
 Form of Jurors Oath Order (Northern Ireland) 1996 (S.R. 1996 No. 268)
 Juries Regulations (Northern Ireland) 1996 (S.R. 1996 No. 269)
 Northern Ireland Disability Council (No. 2) Regulations (Northern Ireland) 1996 (S.R. 1996 No. 272)
 Diseases of Animals (Modification No. 2) Order (Northern Ireland) 1996 (S.R. 1996 No. 273)
 Equine Viral Arteritis Order (Northern Ireland) 1996 (S.R. 1996 No. 274)
 Motor Vehicles (Construction and Use) (Amendment) Regulations (Northern Ireland) 1996 (S.R. 1996 No. 275)
 Industrial Training Levy (Construction Industry) Order (Northern Ireland) 1996 (S.R. 1996 No. 276)
 Disability Discrimination Act 1995 (Commencement No. 3 and Saving and Transitional Provisions) Order (Northern Ireland) 1996 (S.R. 1996 No. 280)
 Crown Court (Amendment No. 2) Rules (Northern Ireland) 1996 (S.R. 1996 No. 281)
 Rules of the Supreme Court (Northern Ireland) (Amendment No. 2) 1996 (S.R. 1996 No. 282)
 Rules of the Supreme Court (Northern Ireland) (Amendment No. 3) 1996 (S.R. 1996 No. 283)
 Pensions (1995 Order) (Commencement No. 3) Order (Northern Ireland) 1996 (S.R. 1996 No. 284)
 Jobseekers (1995 Order) (Commencement No. 3) Order (Northern Ireland) 1996 (S.R. 1996 No. 285)
 Food Safety (General Food Hygiene) (Amendment) Regulations (Northern Ireland) 1996 (S.R. 1996 No. 286)
 Dairy Products (Hygiene) (Amendment) Regulations (Northern Ireland) 1996 (S.R. 1996 No. 287)
 Child Benefit, Child Support and Social Security (Miscellaneous Amendments) Regulations (Northern Ireland) 1996 (S.R. 1996 No. 288)
 Social Security and Child Support (Jobseeker's Allowance) (Consequential Amendments) Regulations (Northern Ireland) 1996 (S.R. 1996 No. 289)
 Social Security (Disability Living Allowance) (Amendment) Regulations (Northern Ireland) 1996 (S.R. 1996 No. 290)
 Income-Related Benefits (Miscellaneous Amendments No. 2) Regulations (Northern Ireland) 1996 (S.R. 1996 No. 291)
 Police and Criminal Evidence (Application to Customs and Excise) (Amendment) Order (Northern Ireland) 1996 (S.R. 1996 No. 292)
 County Courts (Amendment) (1996 Order) (Commencement) Order (Northern Ireland) 1996 (S.R. 1996 No. 293)
 County Court (Amendment No. 2) Rules (Northern Ireland) 1996 (S.R. 1996 No. 294)
 County Court (Amendment No. 3) Rules (Northern Ireland) 1996 (S.R. 1996 No. 295)
 Divorce etc. (Pensions) Regulations (Northern Ireland) 1996 (S.R. 1996 No. 296)
 Children (1995 Order) (Commencement No. 3) Order (Northern Ireland) 1996 (S.R. 1996 No. 297)
 Students Awards (No. 2) Regulations (Northern Ireland) 1996 (S.R. 1996 No. 298)
 Motor Vehicles (Driving Licences) (Fees) (Amendment) Regulations (Northern Ireland) 1996 (S.R. 1996 No. 299)
 Children (Allocation of Proceedings) Order (Northern Ireland) 1996 (S.R. 1996 No. 300)

301-400

 Children (Admissibility of Hearsay Evidence) Order (Northern Ireland) 1996 (S.R. 1996 No. 301)
 Juvenile Courts and Assessors for County Courts (Amendment) Regulations (Northern Ireland) 1996 (S.R. 1996 No. 302)
 Motor Vehicles (Taxi Drivers' Licences) (Amendment) Regulations (Northern Ireland) 1996 (S.R. 1996 No. 304)
 Motor Vehicles (Driving Licences) (Large Goods and Passenger-Carrying Vehicles) (Fees) (Amendment) Regulations (Northern Ireland) 1996 (S.R. 1996 No. 305)
 Pensions (1995 Order) (Commencement No. 4) Order (Northern Ireland) 1996 (S.R. 1996 No. 307)
 Parking Places on Roads (Amendment No. 2) Order (Northern Ireland) 1996 (S.R. 1996 No. 309)
 Control of Traffic (Antrim) Order (Northern Ireland) 1996 (S.R. 1996 No. 310)
 Fodder Plant Seeds (Amendment) Regulations (Northern Ireland) 1996 (S.R. 1996 No. 311)
 Oil and Fibre Plant Seeds (Amendment) Regulations (Northern Ireland) 1996 (S.R. 1996 No. 312)
 Vegetable Seeds (Amendment) Regulations (Northern Ireland) 1996 (S.R. 1996 No. 313)
 Police (Amendment) (1995 Order) (Commencement No. 1) Order (Northern Ireland) 1996 (S.R. 1996 No. 316)
 Child Support (Miscellaneous Amendments) Regulations (Northern Ireland) 1996 (S.R. 1996 No. 317)
 Income Support (General) (Standard Interest Rate Amendment No. 2) Regulations (Northern Ireland) 1996 (S.R. 1996 No. 318)
 Social Security (Back to Work Bonus) (Amendment) Regulations (Northern Ireland) 1996 (S.R. 1996 No. 319)
 Non-automatic Weighing Machines and Non-automatic Weighing Instruments (Amendment) Regulations (Northern Ireland) 1996 (S.R. 1996 No. 320)
 Rules of the Supreme Court (Northern Ireland) (Amendment No. 4) 1996 (S.R. 1996 No. 321)
 Family Proceedings Rules (Northern Ireland) 1996 (S.R. 1996 No. 322)
 Magistrates' Courts (Children (Northern Ireland) Order 1995) Rules (Northern Ireland) 1996 (S.R. 1996 No. 323)
 Magistrates' Courts (Domestic Proceedings) Rules (Northern Ireland) 1996 (S.R. 1996 No. 324)
 Magistrates' Courts (Children and Young Persons) (Amendment) Rules (Northern Ireland) 1996 (S.R. 1996 No. 325)
 Social Security (Reciprocal Agreements) Order (Northern Ireland) 1996 (S.R. 1996 No. 327)
 Education Reform (Amendment) Order (Northern Ireland) 1996 (S.R. 1996 No. 328)
 Education (1996 Order) (Commencement No. 1) Order (Northern Ireland) 1996 (S.R. 1996 No. 329)
 Curriculum (Programmes of Study and Attainment Target in Home Economics at Key Stages 3 and 4) Order (Northern Ireland) 1996 (S.R. 1996 No. 330)
 Curriculum (Programmes of Study and Attainment Targets in Physical Education at Key Stages 3 and 4) Order (Northern Ireland) 1996 (S.R. 1996 No. 331)
 Curriculum (Programme of Study in Business Studies at Key Stage 4) Order (Northern Ireland) 1996 (S.R. 1996 No. 332)
 Curriculum (Programmes of Study in Economics, Political Studies and Social and Environmental Studies at Key Stage 4) Order (Northern Ireland) 1996 (S.R. 1996 No. 333)
 Housing Benefit (General and Supply of Information) (Jobseeker's Allowance) (Consequential Amendments) Regulations (Northern Ireland) 1996 (S.R. 1996 No. 334)
 Curriculum (Programmes of Study and Attainment Targets in Science at Key Stages 3 and 4) Order (Northern Ireland) 1996 (S.R. 1996 No. 335)
 Curriculum (Programme of Study in Drama at Key Stage 4) Order (Northern Ireland) 1996 (S.R. 1996 No. 336)
 Curriculum (Programmes of Study and Attainment Target in Art and Design at Key Stages 3 and 4) Order (Northern Ireland) 1996 (S.R. 1996 No. 337)
 Curriculum (Programmes of Study and Attainment Target in Technology and Design at Key Stages 3 and 4) Order (Northern Ireland) 1996 (S.R. 1996 No. 338)
 Curriculum (Programmes of Study and Attainment Target in Music at Key Stages 3 and 4) Order (Northern Ireland) 1996 (S.R. 1996 No. 339)
 Curriculum (Programme of Study and Attainment Targets in English at Key Stages 3 and 4) Order (Northern Ireland) 1996 (S.R. 1996 No. 340)
 Curriculum (Programme of Study and Attainment Targets in Mathematics at Key Stages 3 and 4) Order (Northern Ireland) 1996 (S.R. 1996 No. 341)
 Curriculum (Programme of Study and Attainment Targets in Modern Languages at Key Stages 3 and 4) Order (Northern Ireland) 1996 (S.R. 1996 No. 342)
 Royal Ulster Constabulary (Discipline and Disciplinary Appeals) (Amendment No. 2) Regulations 1996 (S.R. 1996 No. 343)
 Royal Ulster Constabulary Reserve (Part-time) (Discipline and Disciplinary Appeals) (Amendment No. 2) Regulations 1996 (S.R. 1996 No. 344)
 Social Security (Malta) Order (Northern Ireland) 1996 (S.R. 1996 No. 345)
 Curriculum (Programmes of Study and Attainment Targets at Key Stages 1 and 2) Order (Northern Ireland) 1996 (S.R. 1996 No. 346)
 Curriculum (Programmes of Study and Attainment Target in History at Key Stages 3 and 4) Order (Northern Ireland) 1996 (S.R. 1996 No. 347)
 Curriculum (Programmes of Study and Attainment Target in Geography at Key Stages 3 and 4) Order (Northern Ireland) 1996 (S.R. 1996 No. 348)
 Education (Student Loans) Regulations (Northern Ireland) 1996 (S.R. 1996 No. 349)
 Curriculum (English in Irish Speaking Schools) (Exceptions) Regulations (Northern Ireland) 1996 (S.R. 1996 No. 350)
 Curriculum (Core Syllabus for Religious Education) Order (Northern Ireland) 1996 (S.R. 1996 No. 351)
 Taxis (Strabane) (Amendment) Bye-Laws (Northern Ireland) 1996 (S.R. 1996 No. 352)
 Misuse of Drugs (Amendment) Regulations (Northern Ireland) 1996 (S.R. 1996 No. 353)
 Social Security (Claims and Payments) (Jobseeker's Allowance Consequential Amendments) Regulations (Northern Ireland) 1996 (S.R. 1996 No. 354)
 Social Security (Adjudication) (Amendment) Regulations (Northern Ireland) 1996 (S.R. 1996 No. 355)
 Jobseeker's Allowance (Amendment) Regulations (Northern Ireland) 1996 (S.R. 1996 No. 356)
 Jobseeker's Allowance (Transitional Provisions) (Amendment) Regulations (Northern Ireland) 1996 (S.R. 1996 No. 357)
 Social Security and Child Support (Jobseeker's Allowance) (Amendment) Regulations (Northern Ireland) 1996 (S.R. 1996 No. 358)
 Education (School Information and Prospectuses) (Amendment) Regulations (Northern Ireland) 1996 (S.R. 1996 No. 359)
 Specified Bovine Material (No. 2) Order (Northern Ireland) 1996 (S.R. 1996 No. 360)
 Specified Bovine Material (Treatment and Disposal) (No. 2) Regulations (Northern Ireland) 1996 (S.R. 1996 No. 361)
 Bovine Spongiform Encephalopathy (Amendment) Order (Northern Ireland) 1996 (S.R. 1996 No. 362)
 Education (Assessment Arrangements for Key Stages 1 and 2) Order (Northern Ireland) 1996 (S.R. 1996 No. 363)
 Education (Assessment Arrangements for Key Stage 3) Order (Northern Ireland) 1996 (S.R. 1996 No. 364)
 Temporary Speed Limit (Sydenham By-Pass, Route A2, Belfast) (No. 2) Order (Northern Ireland) 1996 (S.R. 1996 No. 367)
 Control of Traffic (Omagh) Order (Northern Ireland) 1996 (S.R. 1996 No. 368)
 Harbour Works (Assessment of Environmental Effects) (Amendment) Regulations (Northern Ireland) 1996 (S.R. 1996 No. 369)
 One-Way Traffic (Ballymena) (Amendment No. 3) Order (Northern Ireland) 1996 (S.R. 1996 No. 372)
 One-Way Traffic (Ballymena) (Amendment No. 4) Order (Northern Ireland) 1996 (S.R. 1996 No. 373)
 Traffic Weight Restriction (Long Rig Road, Nutts Corner, Crumlin) Order (Northern Ireland) 1996 (S.R. 1996 No. 374)
 Income-Related Benefits (Montserrat) Regulations (Northern Ireland) 1996 (S.R. 1996 No. 375)
 Chemicals (Hazard Information and Packaging for Supply) (Amendment) Regulations (Northern Ireland) 1996 (S.R. 1996 No. 376)
 Lands Tribunal (Salaries) Order (Northern Ireland) 1996 (S.R. 1996 No. 377)
 General Dental Services (Amendment No. 2) Regulations (Northern Ireland) 1996 (S.R. 1996 No. 382)
 Food Labelling Regulations (Northern Ireland) 1996 (S.R. 1996 No. 383)
 Food (Lot Marking) Regulations (Northern Ireland) 1996 (S.R. 1996 No. 384)
 Bread and Flour (Amendment) Regulations (Northern Ireland) 1996 (S.R. 1996 No. 385)
 Repairs Grants (Appropriate Percentage) Order (Northern Ireland) 1996 (S.R. 1996 No. 387)
 Bovine Embryo Collection, Production and Transplantation Regulations (Northern Ireland) 1996 (S.R. 1996 No. 389)
 Specified Bovine Material (Treatment and Disposal) (No. 3) Regulations (Northern Ireland) 1996 (S.R. 1996 No. 390)
 Explosives (Fireworks) Regulations (Northern Ireland) 1996 (S.R. 1996 No. 391)
 Traffic Signs (Amendment No. 2) Regulations (Northern Ireland) 1996 (S.R. 1996 No. 392)
 Pharmaceutical Qualifications (Recognition) Regulations (Northern Ireland) 1996 (S.R. 1996 No. 393)
 Specified Diseases (Notification and Movement Restrictions) (Amendment) Order (Northern Ireland) 1996 (S.R. 1996 No. 398)
 Diseases of Animals (Modification) (No. 3) Order (Northern Ireland) 1996 (S.R. 1996 No. 399)
 Johne's Disease (Revocation) Order (Northern Ireland) 1996 (S.R. 1996 No. 400)

401-500

 Jobseekers (1995 Order) (Commencement No. 4) Order (Northern Ireland) 1996 (S.R. 1996 No. 401)
 Beef (Emergency Control) (Revocation) Order (Northern Ireland) 1996 (S.R. 1996 No. 403)
 Fresh Meat (Beef Controls) Regulations (Northern Ireland) 1996 (S.R. 1996 No. 404)
 Income-Related Benefits and Social Fund (Miscellaneous Amendments) Regulations (Northern Ireland) 1996 (S.R. 1996 No. 405)
 Temporary Speed Limit (Magheramason) Order (Northern Ireland) 1996 (S.R. 1996 No. 406)
 Electricity (Non-Fossil Fuel Sources) Order (Northern Ireland) 1996 (S.R. 1996 No. 407)
 Traffic Signs (Amendment No. 3) Regulations (Northern Ireland) 1996 (S.R. 1996 No. 408)
 Seeds (Fees) Regulations (Northern Ireland) 1996 (S.R. 1996 No. 409)
 Legal Aid (Assessment of Resources) (Amendment) Regulations (Northern Ireland) 1996 (S.R. 1996 No. 410)
 Legal Advice and Assistance (Amendment No. 2) Regulations (Northern Ireland) 1996 (S.R. 1996 No. 411)
 General Ophthalmic Services (Amendment No. 2) Regulations (Northern Ireland) 1996 (S.R. 1996 No. 416)
 Domestic Energy Efficiency Grants (Amendment) Regulations (Northern Ireland) 1996 (S.R. 1996 No. 417)
 Sex Discrimination (Amendment) Regulations (Northern Ireland) 1996 (S.R. 1996 No. 418)
 Disability Discrimination (Employment) Regulations (Northern Ireland) 1996 (S.R. 1996 No. 419)
 Disability Discrimination (Sub-leases and Sub-tenancies) Regulations (Northern Ireland) 1996 (S.R. 1996 No. 420)
 Disability Discrimination (Meaning of Disability) Regulations (Northern Ireland) 1996 (S.R. 1996 No. 421)
 Child Benefit (General) (Amendment) Regulations (Northern Ireland) 1996 (S.R. 1996 No. 422)
 Social Fund (Maternity and Funeral Expenses) (General) (Amendment) Regulations (Northern Ireland) 1996 (S.R. 1996 No. 423)
 Optical Charges and Payments (Amendment No. 2) Regulations (Northern Ireland) 1996 (S.R. 1996 No. 424)
 Travelling Expenses and Remission of Charges (Amendment No. 3) Regulations (Northern Ireland) 1996 (S.R. 1996 No. 425)
 Driving Licences (Community Driving Licence) Regulations (Northern Ireland) 1996 (S.R. 1996 No. 426)
 Heads of Sheep and Goats Order (Northern Ireland) 1996 (S.R. 1996 No. 427)
 Heads of Sheep and Goats (Treatment and Disposal) Regulations (Northern Ireland) 1996 (S.R. 1996 No. 428)
 Explosives (Amendment) Regulations (Northern Ireland) 1996 (S.R. 1996 No. 429)
 Social Security (Credits and Contributions) (Jobseeker's Allowance Consequential and Miscellaneous Amendments) Regulations (Northern Ireland) 1996 (S.R. 1996 No. 430)
 Occupational Pension Schemes (Member-nominated Trustees and Directors) Regulations (Northern Ireland) 1996 (S.R. 1996 No. 431)
 Social Security (Claims and Payments and Adjudication) (Amendment) Regulations (Northern Ireland) 1996 (S.R. 1996 No. 432)
 Social Security (Contributions) (Amendment No. 5) Regulations (Northern Ireland) 1996 (S.R. 1996 No. 433)
 Definition of Independent Visitors (Children) Regulations (Northern Ireland) 1996 (S.R. 1996 No. 434)
 Emergency Protection Order (Transfer of Responsibilities) Regulations (Northern Ireland) 1996 (S.R. 1996 No. 435)
 Adoption Allowance Regulations (Northern Ireland) 1996 (S.R. 1996 No. 438)
 Health and Social Services Trusts (Exercise of Functions) (Amendment) Regulations (Northern Ireland) 1996 (S.R. 1996 No. 439)
 Jobseeker's Allowance and Income Support (Amendment) Regulations (Northern Ireland) 1996 (S.R. 1996 No. 440)
 Social Security and Child Support (Jobseeker's Allowance) (Transitional Provisions) (Amendment) Regulations (Northern Ireland) 1996 (S.R. 1996 No. 441)
 Genetically Modified Organisms (Risk Assessment) (Records and Exemptions) Regulations (Northern Ireland) 1996 (S.R. 1996 No. 442)
 Contact with Children Regulations (Northern Ireland) 1996 (S.R. 1996 No. 443)
 Day Care (Exempt Supervised Activities) Regulations (Northern Ireland) 1996 (S.R. 1996 No. 444)
 Motor Vehicles (Prescribed Restrictions) Regulations (Northern Ireland) 1996 (S.R. 1996 No. 446)
 Gas (Applications for Licences and Extensions) Regulations (Northern Ireland) 1996 (S.R. 1996 No. 447)
 Housing Benefit (General) (Amendment No. 5) Regulations (Northern Ireland) 1996 (S.R. 1996 No. 448)
 Income Support and Social Security (Claims and Payments) (Miscellaneous Amendments) Regulations (Northern Ireland) 1996 (S.R. 1996 No. 449)
 Rural Regeneration and Cross-Border Development Regulations (Northern Ireland) 1996 (S.R. 1996 No. 450)
 Representations Procedure (Children) Regulations (Northern Ireland) 1996 (S.R. 1996 No. 451)
 Children (Private Arrangements for Fostering) Regulations (Northern Ireland) 1996 (S.R. 1996 No. 452)
 Arrangements for Placement of Children (General) Regulations (Northern Ireland) 1996 (S.R. 1996 No. 453)
 Family Law (1993 Orders) (Commencement No. 1) Order (Northern Ireland) 1996 (S.R. 1996 No. 454)
 Plant Protection Products (Amendment) Regulations (Northern Ireland) 1996 (S.R. 1996 No. 456)
 Social Security (Adjudication) and Child Support (Amendment No. 2) Regulations (Northern Ireland) 1996 (S.R. 1996 No. 457)
 Fertilisers (Mammalian Meat and Bone Meal) (Amendment) Regulations (Northern Ireland) 1996 (S.R. 1996 No. 458)
 Employment Protection (Recoupment of Jobseeker's Allowance and Income Support) Regulations (Northern Ireland) 1996 (S.R. 1996 No. 459)
 Export of Animals (Protection) Order (Northern Ireland) 1996 (S.R. 1996 No. 460)
 Review of Children's Cases Regulations (Northern Ireland) 1996 (S.R. 1996 No. 461)
 Motor Vehicles (Construction and Use) (Amendment No. 2) Regulations (Northern Ireland) 1996 (S.R. 1996 No. 462)
 Placement of Children with Parents etc. Regulations (Northern Ireland) 1996 (S.R. 1996 No. 463)
 Social Security (Jobseeker's Allowance and Payments on account) (Miscellaneous Amendments) Regulations (Northern Ireland) 1996 (S.R. 1996 No. 464)
 Equal Pay (Amendment) Regulations (Northern Ireland) 1996 (S.R. 1996 No. 465)
 Industrial Tribunals (Constitution and Rules of Procedure) (Amendment) Regulations (Northern Ireland) 1996 (S.R. 1996 No. 466)
 Foster Placement (Children) Regulations (Northern Ireland) 1996 (S.R. 1996 No. 467)
 Child Minding and Day Care (Applications for Registration) Regulations (Northern Ireland) 1996 (S.R. 1996 No. 468)
 Child Benefit (General) (Amendment No. 2) Regulations (Northern Ireland) 1996 (S.R. 1996 No. 469)
 Child Benefit (General) (Amendment No. 3) Regulations (Northern Ireland) 1996 (S.R. 1996 No. 470)
 Insolvent Companies (Disqualification of Unfit Directors) Proceedings (Amendment) Rules (Northern Ireland) 1996 (S.R. 1996 No. 471)
 Insolvent Partnerships (Amendment) Order (Northern Ireland) 1996 (S.R. 1996 No. 472)
 Royal Ulster Constabulary Regulations 1996 (S.R. 1996 No. 473)
 Roads (Speed Limit) (No. 7) Order (Northern Ireland) 1996 (S.R. 1996 No. 474)
 Employment Rights (1996 Order) (Residuary Commencement No. 1) Order (Northern Ireland) 1996 (S.R. 1996 No. 475)
 Income-Related Benefits and Jobseeker's Allowance (Personal Allowances for Children and Young Persons) (Amendment) Regulations (Northern Ireland) 1996 (S.R. 1996 No. 476)
 Employment of Children Regulations (Northern Ireland) 1996 (S.R. 1996 No. 477)
 Disqualification for Caring for Children Regulations (Northern Ireland) 1996 (S.R. 1996 No. 478)
 Children's Homes Regulations (Northern Ireland) 1996 (S.R. 1996 No. 479)
 Refuges (Children's Homes and Foster Placements) Regulations (Northern Ireland) 1996 (S.R. 1996 No. 480)
 Children (Public Performances) Regulations (Northern Ireland) 1996 (S.R. 1996 No. 481)
 Legal Aid, Advice and Assistance (Amendment) Order (Northern Ireland) 1996 (S.R. 1996 No. 482)
 Legal Advice and Assistance (Amendment No. 3) Regulations (Northern Ireland) 1996 (S.R. 1996 No. 483)
 Optical Charges and Payments (Amendment No. 3) Regulations (Northern Ireland) 1996 (S.R. 1996 No. 484)
 Pneumoconiosis, etc., (Workers' Compensation) (Payment of Claims) (Amendment) Regulations (Northern Ireland) 1996 (S.R. 1996 No. 485)
 Children (Secure Accommodation) Regulations (Northern Ireland) 1996 (S.R. 1996 No. 487)
 Social Fund (Cold Weather Payments) (General) (Amendment) Regulations (Northern Ireland) 1996 (S.R. 1996 No. 488)
 Income Support (General) (Amendment No. 3) Regulations (Northern Ireland) 1996 (S.R. 1996 No. 489)
 Education (Student Loans) (Amendment) Regulations (Northern Ireland) 1996 (S.R. 1996 No. 490)
 Fire Services (Appointments and Promotion) (Amendment) Regulations (Northern Ireland) 1996 (S.R. 1996 No. 491)
 Child Support (1995 Order) (Commencement No. 3) Order (Northern Ireland) 1996 (S.R. 1996 No. 492)
 Occupational Pension Schemes (Contracting-out) Regulations (Northern Ireland) 1996 (S.R. 1996 No. 493)
 Magistrates' Courts Fees (Amendment) Order (Northern Ireland) 1996 (S.R. 1996 No. 494)
 Sheep Annual Premium (Amendment) Regulations (Northern Ireland) 1996 (S.R. 1996 No. 497)
 Hill Livestock (Compensatory Allowances) (Amendment) Regulations (Northern Ireland) 1996 (S.R. 1996 No. 498)
 Social Security (Adjudication) (Amendment No. 2) Regulations (Northern Ireland) 1996 (S.R. 1996 No. 499)
 Registration (Births, Still-Births and Deaths) (Amendment) Regulations (Northern Ireland) 1996 (S.R. 1996 No. 500)

501-600

 Marriage of Children (Consents) (Amendment) Regulations (Northern Ireland) 1996 (S.R. 1996 No. 501)
 Pig Production Development (Levy) Order (Northern Ireland) 1996 (S.R. 1996 No. 502)
 Social Security and Child Support (Jobseeker's Allowance) (Miscellaneous Amendments) Regulations (Northern Ireland) 1996 (S.R. 1996 No. 503)
 Fair Employment (Specification of Public Authorities) (Amendment) Order (Northern Ireland) 1996 (S.R. 1996 No. 504)
 Moorland (Livestock Extensification) (Amendment) Regulations (Northern Ireland) 1996 (S.R. 1996 No. 505)
 Fresh Meat (Beef Controls) (Amendment) Regulations (Northern Ireland) 1996 (S.R. 1996 No. 506)
 Personal Pension Schemes (Appropriate Schemes and Disclosure of Information) (Miscellaneous Amendments) Regulations (Northern Ireland) 1996 (S.R. 1996 No. 508)
 Protected Rights (Transfer Payment) Regulations (Northern Ireland) 1996 (S.R. 1996 No. 509)
 Construction (Health, Safety and Welfare) Regulations (Northern Ireland) 1996 (S.R. 1996 No. 510)
 Health and Safety (Consultation with Employees) Regulations (Northern Ireland) 1996 (S.R. 1996 No. 511)
 Health and Safety Information for Employees (Amendments and Repeals) Regulations (Northern Ireland) 1996 (S.R. 1996 No. 512)
 Fertilisers (Sampling and Analysis) Regulations (Northern Ireland) 1996 (S.R. 1996 No. 513)
 Welfare of Animals (Scheduled Operations) (Amendment) Order (Northern Ireland) 1996 (S.R. 1996 No. 514)
 Spring Traps Approval Order (Northern Ireland) 1996 (S.R. 1996 No. 515)
 Health and Social Services Trusts (Establishment Orders) (Amendment) Order (Northern Ireland) 1996 (S.R. 1996 No. 516)
 Jobseeker's Allowance (Transitional Provisions) (No. 2) Regulations (Northern Ireland) 1996 (S.R. 1996 No. 518)
 Social Security (Back to Work Bonus) (No. 2) Regulations (Northern Ireland) 1996 (S.R. 1996 No. 519)
 Social Security Benefit (Computation of Earnings) Regulations (Northern Ireland) 1996 (S.R. 1996 No. 520)
 Social Security (Invalid Care Allowance) (Amendment) Regulations (Northern Ireland) 1996 (S.R. 1996 No. 521)
 Salaries (Assembly Ombudsman and Commissioner for Complaints) Order (Northern Ireland) 1996 (S.R. 1996 No. 522)
 Motor Hackney Carriages (Belfast) (Amendment No. 2) By-Laws (Northern Ireland) 1996 (S.R. 1996 No. 523)
 Potatoes Originating in the Netherlands (Notification) Regulations (Northern Ireland) 1996 (S.R. 1996 No. 524)
 Health and Safety at Work Order (Application to Environmentally Hazardous Substances) Regulations (Northern Ireland) 1996 (S.R. 1996 No. 525)
 Pesticides (Maximum Residue Levels in Crops, Food and Feeding Stuffs) (National Limits) (Amendment) Regulations (Northern Ireland) 1996 (S.R. 1996 No. 526)
 Pesticides (Maximum Residue Levels in Crops, Food and Feeding Stuffs) (EEC Limits) (Amendment) Regulations (Northern Ireland) 1996 (S.R. 1996 No. 527)
 Children (Prescribed Orders — Isle of Man and Guernsey) Regulations (Northern Ireland) 1996 (S.R. 1996 No. 528)
 Bus Lane (Upper Lisburn Road, Belfast) Order (Northern Ireland) 1996 (S.R. 1996 No. 530)
 Bus Lanes (Shaftesbury Square and Great Victoria Street, Belfast) Order (Northern Ireland) 1996 (S.R. 1996 No. 531)
 Disability Discrimination (Questions and Replies) Order (Northern Ireland) 1996 (S.R. 1996 No. 532)
 Pensions (1995 Order) (Commencement No. 5) Order (Northern Ireland) 1996 (S.R. 1996 No. 534)
 Temporary Speed Limit (Belfast) Order (Northern Ireland) 1996 (S.R. 1996 No. 535)
 Roads (Speed Limit) (No. 8) Order (Northern Ireland) 1996 (S.R. 1996 No. 536)
 Housing Investment Trusts (Assured Tenancies) Regulations (Northern Ireland) 1996 (S.R. 1996 No. 537)
 Specified Bovine Material (No. 2) (Amendment) Order (Northern Ireland) 1996 (S.R. 1996 No. 538)
 Eel Fishing (Licence Duties) Regulations (Northern Ireland) 1996 (S.R. 1996 No. 539)
 Fisheries (Licence Duties) Byelaws (Northern Ireland) 1996 (S.R. 1996 No. 540)
 Child Support Departure Direction and Consequential Amendments Regulations (Northern Ireland) 1996 (S.R. 1996 No. 541)
 Motor Vehicles (Driving Licences) Regulations (Northern Ireland) 1996 (S.R. 1996 No. 542)
 Motor Hackney Carriages (Belfast) (Amendment No. 3) By-Laws (Northern Ireland) 1996 (S.R. 1996 No. 543)
 Occupational Pensions (Revaluation) Order (Northern Ireland) 1996 (S.R. 1996 No. 544)
 Income Support (General) (Standard Interest Rate Amendment No. 3) Regulations (Northern Ireland) 1996 (S.R. 1996 No. 545)
 Students Awards (No. 2) (Amendment) Regulations (Northern Ireland) 1996 (S.R. 1996 No. 546)
 Employment Rights (Health Service Employers) Order (Northern Ireland) 1996 (S.R. 1996 No. 547)
 Disability Discrimination (Guidance and Code of Practice) (Appointed Day) Order (Northern Ireland) 1996 (S.R. 1996 No. 549)
 Control of Traffic (Newry) Order (Northern Ireland) 1996 (S.R. 1996 No. 550)
 Control of Traffic (Castledawson) Order (Northern Ireland) 1996 (S.R. 1996 No. 552)
 Roads (Speed Limit) (No. 9) Order (Northern Ireland) 1996 (S.R. 1996 No. 553)
 Control of Traffic (Belfast) Order (Northern Ireland) 1996 (S.R. 1996 No. 554)
 Traffic Weight Restriction (Killynamph Road, Lisnaskea) Order (Northern Ireland) 1996 (S.R. 1996 No. 555)
 Social Security (Claims and Payments) (Amendment) Regulations (Northern Ireland) 1996 (S.R. 1996 No. 556)
 Disability Discrimination (Services and Premises) Regulations (Northern Ireland) 1996 (S.R. 1996 No. 557)
 Welfare of Animals (Slaughter or Killing) Regulations (Northern Ireland) 1996 (S.R. 1996 No. 558)
 Energy Conservation Act 1996 (Commencement) Order (Northern Ireland) 1996 (S.R. 1996 No. 559)
 Disability Discrimination Act 1995 (Commencement No. 4) Order (Northern Ireland) 1996 (S.R. 1996 No. 560)
 Disability Discrimination Code of Practice (Goods, Facilities, Services and Premises) Order (Northern Ireland) 1996 (S.R. 1996 No. 561)
 Appointment of Consultants Regulations (Northern Ireland) 1996 (S.R. 1996 No. 562)
 Bovine Products (Despatch to Other Member States) Regulations (Northern Ireland) 1996 (S.R. 1996 No. 563)
 Royal Ulster Constabulary Reserve (Full-time) (Appointment and Conditions of Service) Regulations 1996 (S.R. 1996 No. 564)
 Royal Ulster Constabulary Reserve (Part-time) (Appointment and Conditions of Service) Regulations 1996 (S.R. 1996 No. 565)
 Social Security (Contributions) (Amendment No. 6) Regulations (Northern Ireland) 1996 (S.R. 1996 No. 566)
 Education (Assessment Arrangements for Key Stages 1 and 2) (Exceptions) Regulations (Northern Ireland) 1996 (S.R. 1996 No. 567)
 Temporary Speed Limit (Magheramason) (No. 2) Order (Northern Ireland) 1996 (S.R. 1996 No. 568)
 Statutory Sick Pay (General) (Amendment) Regulations (Northern Ireland) 1996 (S.R. 1996 No. 569)
 Occupational Pension Schemes (Minimum Funding Requirement and Actuarial Valuations) Regulations (Northern Ireland) 1996 (S.R. 1996 No. 570)
 Social Fund (Maternity and Funeral Expenses) (General) (Amendment No. 2) Regulations (Northern Ireland) 1996 (S.R. 1996 No. 571)
 Gaming and Amusements with Prizes (Variation of Monetary Limits) Order (Northern Ireland) 1996 (S.R. 1996 No. 572)
 Gaming (Bingo) (Amendment) Regulations (Northern Ireland) 1996 (S.R. 1996 No. 573)
 Insolvency Regulations (Northern Ireland) 1996 (S.R. 1996 No. 574)
 Deeds of Arrangement Regulations (Northern Ireland) 1996 (S.R. 1996 No. 575)
 Insolvency (Fees) (Amendment) Order (Northern Ireland) 1996 (S.R. 1996 No. 576)
 Insolvency (Deposits) (Amendment) Order (Northern Ireland) 1996 (S.R. 1996 No. 577)
 Maintenance Allowances (Pupils over Compulsory School Age) Regulations (Northern Ireland) 1996 (S.R. 1996 No. 578)
 Plastic Materials and Articles in Contact with Food (Amendment No. 2) Regulations (Northern Ireland) 1996 (S.R. 1996 No. 580)
 Industrial Tribunals (Interest on Awards in Sex and Disability Discrimination Cases) Regulations (Northern Ireland) 1996 (S.R. 1996 No. 581)
 Northern Ireland Civil Service Pensions (Provision of Information and Administrative Charges etc.) Scheme (Northern Ireland) 1996 (S.R. 1996 No. 82)
 Disability Working Allowance and Family Credit (General) (Amendment) Regulations (Northern Ireland) 1996 (S.R. 1996 No. 583)
 Occupational Pension Schemes (Investment) Regulations (Northern Ireland) 1996 (S.R. 1996 No. 584)
 Occupational Pension Schemes (Deficiency on Winding Up, etc.) Regulations (Northern Ireland) 1996 (S.R. 1996 No. 585)
 Motor Vehicles (International Circulation) (Amendment) Order (Northern Ireland) 1996 (S.R. 1996 No. 588)
 Child Support (Miscellaneous Amendments No. 2) Regulations (Northern Ireland) 1996 (S.R. 1996 No. 590)
 Diseases of Animals (Modification No. 5) Order (Northern Ireland) 1996 (S.R. 1996 No. 591)
 Diseases of Animals (Modification No. 4) Order (Northern Ireland) 1996 (S.R. 1996 No. 592)
 Bovine Spongiform Encephalopathy (Amendment) (No. 2) Order (Northern Ireland) 1996 (S.R. 1996 No. 593)
 Specified Bovine Material (Treatment and Disposal) (No. 3) (Amendment) Regulations (Northern Ireland) 1996 (S.R. 1996 No. 594)
 Selective Cull (Enforcement of Community Compensation Conditions) Regulations (Northern Ireland) 1996 (S.R. 1996 No. 595)
 Specified Bovine Material (No. 2) (Amendment No. 2) Order (Northern Ireland) 1996 (S.R. 1996 No. 596)
 Bovine Products (Despatch to Other Member States) (Amendment) Regulations (Northern Ireland) 1996 (S.R. 1996 No. 597)
 Unfair Arbitration Agreements (Specified Amount) Order (Northern Ireland) 1996 (S.R. 1996 No. 598)

601-700

 Social Security (Incapacity for Work and Miscellaneous Amendments) Regulations (Northern Ireland) 1996 (S.R. 1996 No. 601)
 Control of Asbestos in Water (Amendment) Regulations (Northern Ireland) 1996 (S.R. 1996 No. 602)
 Surface Waters (Abstraction for Drinking Water) (Classification) Regulations (Northern Ireland) 1996 (S.R. 1996 No. 603)
 Employment Protection (Continuity of Employment) Regulations (Northern Ireland) 1996 (S.R. 1996 No. 604)
 Deseasonalisation Premium (Protection of Payments) Regulations (Northern Ireland) 1996 (S.R. 1996 No. 605)
 Environmentally Sensitive Areas Designation Orders (Amendment) Regulations (Northern Ireland) 1996 (S.R. 1996 No. 606)
 Moorland (Livestock Extensification) (Amendment No. 2) Regulations (Northern Ireland) 1996 (S.R. 1996 No. 607)
 Habitat Improvement (Amendment) Regulations (Northern Ireland) 1996 (S.R. 1996 No. 608)
 Countryside Access (Amendment) Regulations (Northern Ireland) 1996 (S.R. 1996 No. 609)
 Organic Farming Aid (Amendment) Regulations (Northern Ireland) 1996 (S.R. 1996 No. 610)
 Beef Special Premium (Protection of Payments) Regulations (Northern Ireland) 1996 (S.R. 1996 No. 611)
 Laganside Development (Alteration of Designated Area) Order (Northern Ireland) 1996 (S.R. 1996 No. 612)
 Road Humps (Amendment) Regulations (Northern Ireland) 1996 (S.R. 1996 No. 613)
 Traffic Signs (Amendment No. 4) Regulations (Northern Ireland) 1996 (S.R. 1996 No. 614)
 Temporary Speed Limit (Belfast) (No. 2) Order (Northern Ireland) 1996 (S.R. 1996 No. 615)
 Urban Clearways (Londonderry) (Amendment) Order (Northern Ireland) 1996 (S.R. 1996 No. 616)
 Roads (Speed Limit) (No. 10) Order (Northern Ireland) 1996 (S.R. 1996 No. 617)
 Contracting-out (Transfer and Transfer Payment) Regulations (Northern Ireland) 1996 (S.R. 1996 No. 618)
 Occupational Pension Schemes (Transfer Values) Regulations (Northern Ireland) 1996 (S.R. 1996 No. 619)
 Personal and Occupational Pension Schemes (Preservation of Benefit and Perpetuities) (Amendment) Regulations (Northern Ireland) 1996 (S.R. 1996 No. 620)
 Occupational Pension Schemes (Winding Up) Regulations (Northern Ireland) 1996 (S.R. 1996 No. 621)
 Social Security (Child Maintenance Bonus) Regulations (Northern Ireland) 1996 (S.R. 1996 No. 622)
 Control of Traffic (Belfast) (No. 2) Order (Northern Ireland) 1996 (S.R. 1996 No. 623)

External links
  Statutory Rules (NI) List
 Draft Statutory Rules (NI) List

1996
Statutory rules
Northern Ireland Statutory Rules